This is a list of South Korean films that received a domestic theatrical release in 2015.

Box office
The highest-grossing South Korean films released in 2015, by domestic box office gross revenue, are as follows:

Released

References

External links
2015 in South Korea
2015 in South Korean music
List of 2015 box office number-one films in South Korea

2015
Film
South Korean